The Lillie Range of mountains in Antarctica extends northward from the Prince Olav Mountains (in the vicinity of Mount Fisher) to the Ross Ice Shelf. Mounts Hall, Daniel, Krebs and Mason are in the range. It was named by the Southern Party of the New Zealand Geological Survey Antarctic Expedition (1963–64) for A.R. Lillie, professor of geology at the University of Auckland.

References

Dufek Coast
Mountain ranges of Antarctica